The R Line or Aurora Line/I-225 Rail is a Regional Transportation District (RTD) light rail line that serves stations in Aurora, Denver, Greenwood Village, Centennial and Lone Tree. Opening on February 24, 2017, the line was designated as the “R” line, reflecting the letter R’s in “Aurora” and “Ridgegate”.

The line travels over newer and older portions of the RTD Light Rail system. The R Line was preceded by the G Line, which operated from 2006 to 2009 along the southern half of the route. The R Line is the only line in the RTD rail system not serving downtown Denver.

Service south of Lincoln station is currently suspended due to reduced service levels on RTD, as a result of the COVID-19 pandemic.

History

G Line service (2006–2009) 
November 17, 2006 saw the completion of the Southeast Corridor light rail project (part of the Transportation Expansion Project). One of the four routes that were part of the RTD’s service plan for the corridor, the route between Aurora and Lone Tree, was named the “G Line” and assigned the color brown. The G Line’s northern terminus was at Nine Mile Station in Aurora on the I-225 branch of the system, shared with the H Line, while its southern terminus was at Lincoln Avenue Station in Lone Tree, shared with the E and F Lines.

In August 2007, night, Saturday, Sunday and holiday service on this route was discontinued due to low ridership. An exception was the lone northbound Owl service trip on weekend and holiday mornings. Service was further reduced to peak hour-only in August 2008 before being suspended entirely on May 3, 2009.

FasTracks relaunch

I-225 Rail Line 
The 2004 voter-approved FasTracks initiative marked the return of the Aurora-Lone Tree Line. The I-225 Corridor is a  light rail line running through Aurora and facilitates a circumferential link between the Southeast Corridor and the East Corridor. The project will include seven new stations and provide 1,800 new parking spaces. Construction began in spring 2012 on a short section of the line as part of a joint contract with the Colorado Department of Transportation. Following an unsolicited proposal from Kiewit Infrastructure Company, funding was secured for the full line, which was expected to open in winter 2016. The opening date was later pushed back. On January 30, 2017, RTD announced that the H and R Lines would begin service on February 24, 2017.

Southeast Corridor Extension 
On July 28, 2015, a design-build contract for the extension was awarded to Balfour Beatty Infrastructure Inc. Design on the extension began in fall 2015 and construction began in 2016. The extension opened on May 17, 2019.

Route 
The R Line travels south from Peoria Station in northwest Aurora, predominantly following Interstate 225 through central Aurora to Belleview Station in southeast Denver. It then follows Interstate 25 to its terminus at RidgeGate Parkway station in southern Lone Tree. Due to low ridership, the R Line was cut back to Lincoln Station, no longer serving Sky Ridge, Lone Tree City Center, and RidgeGate Parkway Stations.

Stations

References

External links 

RTD R Line Schedule

RTD light rail
Transportation in Aurora, Colorado
Transportation in Arapahoe County, Colorado
Transportation in Douglas County, Colorado
Railway lines in highway medians
Railway lines opened in 2017